The Libertarian Party of Maryland is the Maryland affiliate of the Libertarian Party. The state chair is Eric Blitz.  The party, also known as "LPMaryland," or "LPMD" is Maryland's third-largest political party, with 17,364 registered voters across the state as of August 31, 2022.  According to its website, the party "speaks to the proper relationship between the state and the individual; it does not speak to what individuals ought to do morally.  The state exists to protect  residents and their property from those that would harm." LPMaryland also forms coalitions with other civic organizations who share at least some common ground with libertarians, including groups that concern themselves primarily with civil liberties, world peace, fiscal restraint, and government reform.  The official views of the party on state-level policy issues are set forth in the Libertarian Party of Maryland Platform.

Governance

The Libertarian Party of Maryland is governed primarily by its Constitution and Bylaws. The Constitution and By-laws entrust all party decision-making to the State Central Committee. Currently, any Maryland resident who is an official party member may become a voting member of the Central Committee as long as they are registered Libertarian and certifies that they agree with the principle that no person (or group of persons) has the right to seek to attain values by initiating the use of force or fraud against any other person (or group of persons).  This is one version of the "non-aggression principle," a fundamental principle of liberty and limited government.

Operational management of the party is entrusted to an executive board of the State Central Committee.  The board is composed of a chair, vice-chair, treasurer, and secretary, as well as three at-large members.  The current membership of the executive board (elected to serve through the 2023 Convention) is as follows:
Chair:  Eric Blitz
Vice-Chair:  David Dull
Treasurer:  Robert S. Johnston III
Secretary:  Sherri Drummond
At-Large Members:  Phil Dassing, Alex Schlegel, Tim Miller

The Libertarian Party of Maryland is one of five political parties that are recognized by the Maryland State Board of Elections. Its ability to continue nominating candidates for office without qualifying each candidate separately ("ballot access" for short) depends on its ability to demonstrate sufficient popular support for the party every four years by obtaining 1% of the vote in the gubernatorial elections, maintaining 1% of registered voters, or by obtaining 10,000 valid petition signatures.

2022 Libertarian Candidates 
Governor | Lt. Governor: David Lashar and Christiana Logansmith 

Wicomico County Executive: Muir Boda 

Maryland Senate | District 31: Brian Kunkoski 

Maryland Senate | District 43: Bob Gemmill 

U.S. Congress | 1st District: Daniel Thibeault 

U.S. Congress | 8th District: Kevin Andrés Garcia 

House of Delegates | District 1A: Monique M. Mehring 

House of Delegates | District 31: Travis Lerol 

Anne Arundel County Council | District 2: Dave Sgambellone 

Baltimore County Council | District 7: Doug Stanley 

Harford County Council | District F: Matthew Whitlock

Electoral history

James Cook is a Libertarian elected to Rock Hall City Council in 2021. 

Muir Boda is a Libertarian elected to the Salisbury City Council in 2015.

See also
 2022 Maryland gubernatorial election
 Libertarian Party
 Maryland elections
 Maryland Senate
 Maryland House of Delegates

References

External links
 Libertarian Party of Maryland

Maryland
Political parties in Maryland
1971 establishments in Maryland